União Desportiva do Nordeste (known as UD Nordeste or U. Nordeste), is a Portuguese football club based in Nordeste on the island of São Miguel in the Azores.

Background
UD Nordeste currently plays in the AF Ponta Delgada 1ª Divisão (known as the Campeonato de S. Miguel) which is the fifth tier of Portuguese football. The club was founded in 1964 and they play their home matches at the Estádio Municipal de Nordeste in Nordeste. The stadium is able to accommodate 2,000 spectators.

The club is affiliated to Associação de Futebol de Ponta Delgada and has competed in the AF Ponta Delgada Taça. The club has also entered the national cup competition known as Taça de Portugal on one occasion, losing on penalties at home to Fayal SC on 3 September 2006.

Season to season

Gallery

Footnotes

External links
Official website (blog)

Football clubs in Portugal
Football clubs in the Azores
Association football clubs established in 1964
1964 establishments in Portugal
Football clubs in São Miguel Island
Nordeste, Azores